Dematochroma is a genus of leaf beetles in the subfamily Eumolpinae. It is mostly distributed in New Caledonia, though it is also found on Lord Howe Island, Norfolk Island and Timor. Adult beetles (usually less than 1 cm long) are often found at night feeding on leaves, and the larvae eat roots. It is possible the genus is polyphyletic or paraphyletic.

The genus Thasycles Chapuis, 1874 was for a long time treated as a synonym of this genus, until it was reinstated as a valid genus in 2022.

Species

 Dematochroma antipodum (Fauvel, 1862)
 Dematochroma antipodumoides Jolivet, Verma & Mille, 2010
 Dematochroma cancellata (Samuelson, 2010)
 Dematochroma culminicola (Heller, 1916)
 Dematochroma difficilis (Heller, 1916)
 Dematochroma doiana Jolivet, Verma & Mille, 2007
 Dematochroma helleri Jolivet, Verma & Mille, 2007
 Dematochroma howensis Jolivet, Verma & Mille, 2006
 Dematochroma humboldtiana (Heller, 1916)
 Dematochroma lepros (Heller, 1916)
 Dematochroma maculifrons (Heller, 1916)
 Dematochroma norfolkiana Jolivet, Verma & Mille, 2006
 Dematochroma picea Baly, 1864
 Dematochroma poyensis Jolivet, Verma & Mille, 2010
 Dematochroma samuelsoni Jolivet, Verma & Mille, 2011
 Dematochroma shuteae Jolivet, Verma & Mille, 2006
 Dematochroma soldatii Jolivet, Verma & Mille, 2010
 Dematochroma sylviae Jolivet, Verma & Mille, 2010
 Dematochroma terastiomerus (Heller, 1916)
 Dematochroma terminaliae Jolivet, Verma & Mille, 2010
 Dematochroma theryi Jolivet, Verma & Mille, 2010
 Dematochroma thyiana Jolivet, Verma & Mille, 2008
 Dematochroma timorense Jacoby, 1894

The following species have been transferred to other genera:
 Dematochroma foaensis Jolivet, Verma & Mille, 2007: transferred to Rhyparida
 Dematochroma fusca Jolivet, Verma & Mille, 2007: transferred to Thasycles
 Dematochroma laboulbenei (Montrouzier, 1861): transferred to Thasycles
 Dematochroma panieensis Jolivet, Verma & Mille, 2007: transferred to Thasycles
 Dematochroma pilosa Jolivet, Verma & Mille, 2007: transferred to Dematotrichus

References

External links
 Genus Dematochroma Baly, 1864 at Australian Faunal Directory

Eumolpinae
Chrysomelidae genera
Beetles of Oceania
Beetles of Australia
Insects of New Caledonia
Taxa named by Joseph Sugar Baly